Azər Vəlhəd oğlu Salahlı (born 11 April 1994) is an Azerbaijani professional footballer who plays as a defender for Neftçi.

Club career
Salahlı made his debut in the Azerbaijan Premier League for Keşla on 17 May 2014, match against Shuvalan.

International career
He made his national team debut on 10 October 2020 in a Nations League game against Montenegro.

Honours
Qarabağ
Azerbaijan Premier League (1): 2015–16
Azerbaijan Cup (1): 2015–16

International
Azerbaijan U23
 Islamic Solidarity Games: (1) 2017

References

External links
 

1994 births
Living people
Association football midfielders
Azerbaijani footballers
Azerbaijan youth international footballers
Azerbaijan under-21 international footballers
Azerbaijan international footballers
Azerbaijan Premier League players
Shamakhi FK players
Qarabağ FK players
Sumgayit FK players